The 1948–49 season was Mansfield Town's 11th season in the Football League and seventh season in the Third Division North, they finished in 10th position with 42 points.

Final league table

Results

Football League Third Division North

FA Cup

Squad statistics
 Squad list sourced from

References
General
 Mansfield Town 1948–49 at soccerbase.com (use drop down list to select relevant season)

Specific

Mansfield Town F.C. seasons
Mansfield Town